Guido Mazzoni (1859–1943) was an Italian poet.

Biography
Mazzoni was born in Florence, and educated in Pisa and Bologna. In 1887 he became professor of Italian at Padua, and in 1894 at Florence, where he remained until retirement in 1934. He was much influenced by Carducci, and became prominent both as prolific and well-read critic and as a poet of individual distinction.

In 1910, he was elected a senator. In 1915, his son Carlo was taken prisoner by Austrian forces; the father volunteered for combat duty in exchange, and participated in combat along the Isonzo River.

His chief volumes of verse are Versi (1880), Nuove poesie (1886), Poesie (1891), Voci della vita (1893).

Notes

References

Amedeo Benedetti,  Contributo alla biografia di Guido Mazzoni , "Otto / Novecento", a. XXXV (2011), n. 3, pp. 21–40.

External links
Guido Mazzoni Pamphlet Collection, David M. Rubenstein Library, Duke University.

Italian poets
Italian male poets
1859 births
1943 deaths